Na Jong-chan (born September 17, 1994) better known by his stage name Na In-woo (Korean: 나인우), is a South Korean actor. He is best known for his roles in Mr. Queen (2020–2021) and River Where the Moon Rises (2021). He is a cast member of the variety show 2 Days & 1 Night since 2022.

Career

2013–2019: Debut and early career
Na made his debut in 2013 through the musical Bachelor's Vegetable Store. 

In 2014, Na appeared in the SBS weekend drama Glorious Day, making a slight appearance. 

In 2015, Na made his official debut in the TV drama Shine or Go Crazy followed by the drama My Mom, earning it a nomination at the awards ceremony, 2015 MBC Drama Awards for Best New Actor category. In the same year Na starred in the film Twenty by playing the role of Dong Won, Dongwoo's younger brother, played by Lee Jun-ho.

In 2016, Na starred in the web drama Spark. In the same year, Na appeared in an episode of Cinderella with Four Knights . Na also appeared in the daily drama Golden Pouch aired on MBC. In the same year, Na appeared in the Film The Car Crash : Hit by Dongho. 

In 2018, Na appeared in season 1's web drama It's Okay to be Sensitive with Kim Young-dae.

In 2019, Na appeared in the MBN drama Best Chicken. Na later appeared in two weeks' episodes of Home for Summer, a KBS1 daily drama, and then became a regular of its subsequent series Unasked Family. Na also appeared in the web drama Yeonnam Family which aired on Olleh TV.  In 2019, Na changed his stage name from Na Jong-chan to Na In-woo.

2020–present: Career breakthrough and MC 

In 2020, Na participated in the drama Mystic Pop-up Bar which aired on JTBC. Later the same year, Na joined the tvN hystorical drama Mr. Queen. The drama was a success, becoming the 7th highest-rated drama in Korean cable television history and boosting him into international fame.
 
In 2021, Na was confirmed to star in the movie Her Bucket List with Kim So-hye. In the same month, Na confirmed for a cameo appearance in the drama At A Distance Spring Is Green . 
Later in March 2021, Na joined the KBS2 historical drama River Where the Moon Rises as its male lead from 6th episode, replacing Ji Soo who was dropped out from the series following bullying accusations made against him. Despite the last-minute substitutions and casting situations in the ongoing drama, Na's acting and chemistry with lead actress Kim So-hyun was well received by the audience. As Na's first lead role, Na was nominated at the 57th Baeksang Arts Awards in the Best New Actor – Television category.  

In May 2021, Na was confirmed as the male lead in the drama Jinxed at First with Seohyun. In July, he was selected as the MC of the web music program OUTNOW Unlimited airing on Playlist, Naver Now.

In January 2022, Na became a fixed cast member of the season 4 of KBS2 reality show 2 Days & 1 Night.

Filmography

Film

Television series

Television shows

Web series

Web show

Hosting

Musical

Awards and nominations

Notes

References

External links
  
 
 
 

1994 births
Living people
South Korean male television actors
South Korean male film actors
South Korean male web series actors
Cube Entertainment artists